Floyd L. Griffin Jr. (born May 24, 1944) is an American politician who served as the mayor of Milledgeville, Georgia, from 2001 to 2005, and in the Georgia State Senate from the 25th district from 1995 to 1999, as a member of the Democratic Party. He sought the Democratic Party's nomination for Lieutenant Governor of Georgia in 1998 and Georgia Secretary of State in 2022.

Early life and career
Floyd L. Griffin Jr. earned an Associate of Science in funeral service from Gupton-Jones College, a Bachelor of Science from the Tuskegee Institute in building construction, and a master's degree from the Florida Institute of Technology in contract procurement and management. He served in the United States Army and graduated from the Army Command and General Staff College and the National War College. Griffin flew combat helicopters missions during the Vietnam War. As an officer, Griffin taught military science at Wake Forest University and Winston-Salem State University. He also coached the offensive backfield for the Winston-Salem State Rams college football team.

Griffin retired from the Army in 1990 at the rank of colonel. He took over the family business, Slater's Funeral Home.

Political career
In the 1994 elections, Griffin ran against Wilbur Baugh for the 25th district in the Georgia State Senate. Griffin defeated Baugh in a runoff election and was elected to the state senate without Republican opposition. He became the first African American to win a majority Caucasian district in the Georgia State Senate since the end of the Reconstruction era. In 1998, Griffin ran for lieutenant governor of Georgia. Griffin finished the primary election in fifth place. He ran to reclaim his seat in the Georgia Senate in the 2000 elections, but lost. He was elected mayor of Milledgeville in the 2001 election, and was sworn in on January 1, 2002. He served as mayor until 2006; Griffin lost reelection to Richard Bentley in the 2005 election.

Griffin published an autobiography, Legacy to Legend: Winners: Make it Happen, in 2009. He ran for the 25th district seat in the Georgia Senate in 2010, and lost to Johnny Grant. Griffin ran for mayor of Milledgeville in the 2015 election, but lost to Gary Thrower by 35 votes. He ran for the 145th district of the Georgia House of Representatives in the 2016 elections, and faced Rick Williams, who is also a funeral director. Griffin lost the election to Williams.

Griffin served as an at-large delegate at the 2020 Democratic National Convention. In May 2021, the city of Milledgeville dedicated a street in Griffin's honor. Griffin announced his candidacy for Georgia Secretary of State in the 2022 elections. Griffin was eliminated in the primary election, as Bee Nguyen and Dee Dawkins-Haigler advanced to a runoff election.

Personal life
Griffin and his wife, Nathalie, have two children.

References

External links

Living people
1944 births
People from Milledgeville, Georgia
Democratic Party members of the Georgia House of Representatives
Democratic Party Georgia (U.S. state) state senators
Mayors of places in Georgia (U.S. state)
Tuskegee Institute alumni
Florida Institute of Technology alumni
United States Army Command and General Staff College alumni
Military personnel from Georgia (U.S. state)
National War College alumni
United States Army officers
American military personnel of the Vietnam War
Wake Forest University faculty
Winston-Salem State Rams football coaches
Winston-Salem State University faculty
African-American people in Georgia (U.S. state) politics